A Man of Stone is a 1921 American silent drama film directed by George Archainbaud and starring Conway Tearle, Betty Howe, and Martha Mansfield.

Plot
As described in a film magazine, after returning to London, Captain Deering (Tearle) of the British army finds that, during his absence from England, his fiancée Lady Fortescue (Mansfield) has jilted him for Lord Reggie (Brown). Stung with mortification, he accepts service in the Arabian desert and is attracted to a pretty young Arabian woman Laila (Howe), who nurses him through a fever when he becomes ill. Lady Fortescue has a change of heart and arrives as the desert camp while Captain Deering is absent. She tells Laila that she is Deering's wife. Laila leaves the camp and is attacked by a marauding band. Captain Deering and his troops rescue Laila, and there is a promise of continued happiness between them.

Cast
 Conway Tearle as Capt. Deering 
 Betty Howe as Laila 
 Martha Mansfield as Lady Fortescue 
 Colin Campbell as Lt. Waite 
 Warren Cook as Lord Branton 
 Charles D. Brown as Lord Reggie
 Henry Kolker (uncredited)

References

Bibliography
 Matthew Kennedy. Edmund Goulding's Dark Victory: Hollywood's Genius Bad Boy. Terrace Books, 2004.

External links

A Man of Stone at silenthollywood.com

1921 films
1921 drama films
Silent American drama films
Films directed by George Archainbaud
American silent feature films
1920s English-language films
Selznick Pictures films
Films set in London
1920s American films
English-language drama films